Superprestigio of the Americas is an invitation-only flat track motorcycle race that pits motorcycle racers from various racing disciplines (Road racing, Freestyle, Hillclimb, and Flat Track) against many of the best racers from the AMA Pro Racing Flat Track Championship series.

The inaugural Superprestigio of the Americas was held on 21 November 2015 on a specially-designed indoor short track at the Orleans Hotel & Casino in Las Vegas, Nevada. The race was broadcast live on fanschoice.tv and was produced for national broadcast on NBC Sports Network the following Sunday, 29 November.

Competitors

AMA pro-racing flat-track invitations
Selected for their points standings or specific race accomplishments in the AMA Pro Racing Flat Track Championship were Brad Baker, Briar Bauman, Dan Bromley, Stevie Bonsey, Kenny Coolbeth, Davis Fisher, Sammy Halbert, Jesse Janisch, Jake Johnson, Justin Jones, Doug Lawrence, Andrew Luker, Jared Mees, Bryan Smith, Jarod Vanderkooi and Henry Wiles

All-star invitations
Selected from various motorcycle disciplines were:
Oliver Brindley, DTRA Dirt Track
Aaron Colton, XDL Sportbike Freestyle Championship
Toni Elias, MotoGP
Jake Gagne, AMA Superbike Championship
Roger Hayden, AMA Superbike Championship
Josh Hayes, AMA Superbike Championship
Taylor Knapp, AMA Superbike Championship
Phil Libhart, AMA Pro Hillclimb
Gage McAllister, AMA Superbike Championship
Larry Pegram, AMA Superbike Championship
Dani Ribalta, Endurance FIM World Championship
Joe Roberts, AMA Superbike Championship
Franc Serra, FIM Flat Track Cup
Anthony West, MotoGP
Blake Young, AMA Superbike Championship

Competitors ranged in age from 17-year-old Oliver Brindley to 43-year-old Phil Libhart.

Sanction, rules and construction
Superprestigio of the Americas was sanctioned by AMA Pro Racing and overseen by the Fédération Internationale de Motocyclisme by Stuart Higgs as race director.

Motorcycle equipment rules were as per AMA Pro Flat Track GNC1 Singles, except that all machines were ha 19" Mitas tires.

The track was designed by the 7-times AMA Grand National Championship winner, Chris Carr who designated that the track have an American football-shape infield in order to produce multiple racing lines and therefore more competition. The track was built in two layers with a base of clay/rock mix as a foundation with decomposed granite for the racing surface. Track construction was done by the renowned track builder Dennis Pearson. A motocross-style starting gate (rather uncommon for flat track racing) was used.

Competition
A points system was used to award finishers in the heat races the opportunity to choose their starting positions for the semifinals. Points were awarded as follows: 10 points for 1st place, 7 for 2nd, 5 for 3rd, 3 for 4th, 2 for 5th and 1 for 6th.

Finishing positions in semifinals and Last Chance Qualifiers determined eligibility and starting positions for Finals.

Roland Sands Designs and Indian Motorcycles brought the Super Hooligans as a supporting class.

In a format designed to intensify the action, there were 31 races run during the program.

Road racing World Champion Kevin Schwantz, a former amateur flat tracker himself, was the Grand Marshal for the event.

The winner of the Superprestigio of the Americas, Jared Mees, was awarded a custom gold and diamond ring from Thom Duma Fine Jewelers. The podium finishers, Mees, Brad Baker and Kenny Coolbeth, are all former GNC Championship winners.

Results

All-stars final

Flat Track Final

Superprestigio of the Americas

Super Hooligans Final

References 

Motorcycle races